Wake Up the Coma is the sixteenth full-length studio album by Vancouver industrial band Front Line Assembly. It was released on February 8, 2019 on CD, vinyl and digitally through Metropolis.

Release and promotion
A digital only single titled "Eye on You", originally scheduled for release on November 2, 2018, was released on November 16 to promote the album. It features Robert Görl of German electropunk band Deutsch Amerikanische Freundschaft and contains two remixes of the title track: one by Terence Fixmer and one by Orphx.

The release date of the album was moved from October 2018 to February 2019. In December, the band announced the final release date of February 8, 2019. Chris Connelly, Nick Holmes and Jimmy Urine would appear on the album as guests, the latter on a cover of Falco's "Rock Me Amadeus". In January 2019 the band revealed the album's tracklist.

Two days before the album's release, a video for "Rock Me Amadeus" directed by Jason Alacrity premiered at Baeble Music.

On December 2, 2020 Front Line Assembly released a video for the track "Arbeit" directed by Henrik Bjerregaard Clausen and starring Danish actor Kim Sønderholm.

Themes
"'Eye on You' is definitely about the paranoia of our governments watching us [...], but there’s a couple of songs that are about the complexities in relationships between people today as well", said vocalist Bill Leeb in an interview with Release Magazine.

Track listing

Personnel

Front Line Assembly
 Bill Leeb – vocals, keyboards, producer
 Rhys Fulber – keyboards, programming, producer, mixing (5, 9)

Additional musicians
 Jared Slingerland – additional production, additional programming (2, 4–12)
 Sasha Keevill – additional production, additional programming (2, 4–12)
 Craig Johnsen – additional programming (5, 7, 8, 11, 12)
 Robert Görl – additional programming (1)
 Jimmy Urine – lead vocals (3)
 Nick Holmes – lead vocals (8)
 Chris Connelly – lead vocals (12)
 Ian Pickering – backing vocals (10)
 Matt Lange – guitars (8, 12)
 Jeff Swearengin – additional programming (4, 12)
 Jeremy Inkel – additional programming (9, 11)

Technical personnel
 Greg Reely – mixing (1–4, 6–8, 10–12), vocal recording
 Dave McKean – artwork, design

Chart positions

References

Front Line Assembly albums
2019 albums
Metropolis Records albums
Albums with cover art by Dave McKean
Albums produced by Rhys Fulber